Badminton tournaments were held for the second time at the fifth Asian Games in 1966 in Indoor Stadium Huamark, Bangkok from 10 to 20 December 1966.

Singles, doubles, and team events were contested for both men and women. Mixed Doubles were also contested.

Medalists

Medal table

Semifinal results

Final results

References
Results

External links
Badminton Asia

 
1966 Asian Games events
1966
Asian Games
Multi-sport events, Asian Games
Multi-sport events, Asian Games